R. Kannan (born Rajmohan on 21 July 1971) is an Indian filmmaker. He made his directorial debut with the successful Tamil film Jayamkondaan starring Vinay Rai and Bhavana in 2008.

Career
Kannan started his career assisting director Manobala before joining Mani Ratnam for films including Kannathil Muthamittal (2002), Ayutha Ezhuthu (2004)  and Guru (2007). He made his directorial debut with the drama film, Jayamkondaan (2008) starring Vinay, Bhavana and Lekha Washington, winning critical acclaim and commercial success at the box office. Featuring the story of an estranged brother and sister fighting over an ancestral property, Kannan won praise for his work. Sify.com stated that Kannan "has the potential to churn out a neat feel-good entertainer", adding that "the most refreshing thing about Kannan's film is that he tries to combine mainstream Tamil film aesthetics with mass appeal". His second film, Kanden Kadhalai, a remake of Imtiaz Ali's Jab We Met (2007), featured Bharath and Tamannaah Bhatia in the lead roles and was also successful commercially. His subsequent releases Vandhaan Vendraan with Jiiva and Taapsee Pannu, and the remake of Delhi Belly in Tamil as Settai with Arya.

After the release of Settai, Kannan began pre-production works on a film titled Alangaram to be produced by PVP Cinemas during early 2014. He revealed that he had worked on the script for over two years and began negotiations with Karthi to play the lead role and Santhanam to portray a supporting role.

In October 2014, Kannan announced that he would direct and co-produce a film titled Poda! Aandavane En Pakkam, which would highlight the struggles faced by engineering degree graduates. After unsuccessful negotiations with Dinesh and Sridivya, Kannan eventually finalised Vishnu, Prayaga Martin and Swetha Ashok for the leading roles. The film began production in March 2015, with the team shooting for a single schedule and songs in Chennai with the lead actors. However the film failed to progress beyond the first schedule and was ultimately shelved. Kannan announced that he was simultaneously working on the script of a horror comedy titled Adiye Kantha in December 2014, but the film also did not materialise.<ref>{{cite web | title="Poda Aandavane En Pakkam" and Adiye Kantha' - some popular Tamil movie based on dialogues | website=The News Minute | date=2015-01-20 | url=https://www.thenewsminute.com/article/poda-aandavane-en-pakkam-and-adiye-kantha-some-popular-tamil-movie-based-dialogues-17899 | access-date=2020-08-28}}</ref> In August 2016, he began work on an action film titled Ivan Thanthiran starring Gautham Karthik in the lead role.

Filmography

As an actorAaytha Ezhuthu (2004)Ko'' (2011)

References

External links
 

Tamil film directors
Living people
1971 births
People from Kanchipuram district
Tamil screenwriters
Indian Tamil people
Screenwriters from Tamil Nadu
Film directors from Tamil Nadu
21st-century Indian film directors